"The 500 Greatest Albums of All Time" is a recurring opinion survey and music ranking of the finest albums in history, compiled by the American magazine Rolling Stone. It is based on weighted votes from selected musicians, critics, and industry figures. The first list was published in a special issue of the magazine in 2003 and a related book in 2005.

Critics have accused the lists of lending disproportionate weight to artists of particular races and genders. In the original list, most of the selections were albums by white male rock musicians, with the top position held by the Beatles' Sgt. Pepper's Lonely Hearts Club Band (1967). In 2012, Rolling Stone published a revised edition, drawing on the original and a later survey of albums released up until the early 2000s.

Another updated edition of the list was published in 2020, with 154 new entries not in either of the two previous editions. It was based on a new survey and did not factor in the surveys conducted for the 2003 and 2012 lists. The 2020 list featured more artists of color and female artists, and was topped by Marvin Gaye's What's Going On (1971). It received similar criticisms as the previous lists.

Background

The first version of the list, published as a magazine in November 2003, was based on the votes of 273 rock musicians, critics, and industry figures, each of whom submitted a ranked list of 50 albums. The accounting firm Ernst & Young devised a point system to weigh votes for 1,600 submitted titles. The Beatles' 1967 album Sgt. Pepper's Lonely Hearts Club Band topped the list, with Rolling Stones editors describing it as "the most important rock 'n' roll album ever made". The Beach Boys' Pet Sounds (1966) was ranked second in recognition of its influence on Sgt. Pepper. The list also included compilations and "greatest hits" collections.

An amended list was released as a book in 2005, with an introduction by guitarist Steven Van Zandt. Some compilation albums were removed, and Robert Johnson's The Complete Recordings was substituted for both of his King of the Delta Blues Singers volumes, making room for a total of eight new entries on the list.

On May 31, 2012, Rolling Stone published a revised list, drawing on the original and a later survey of albums up until the early 2000s. It was made available in "bookazine" format on newsstands in the US from April 27 to July 25. The new list contained 38 albums not present in the previous one, 16 of them released after 2003. The top listings remained unchanged.

Most of the albums on the initial lists were by white male rock musicians. Among the top 50 rankings, only 12 entries were by artists of color, none of whom were female, and only three albums by white women figured in the top 50.

On September 22, 2020, another revision of the list was published. It drew upon a new survey conducted with "more than 300 artists, producers, critics, and music-industry figures", including:

 Craig Kallman
 Beyoncé
 Taylor Swift
 Billie Eilish
 H.E.R.
 Tierra Whack
 Lindsey Jordan
 Adam Clayton
 The Edge
 Raekwon
 Gene Simmons
 Stevie Nicks

Each voter was asked to submit a ranked list of 50 favorite albums. This time, the list included more musicians who were female and people of color, with many such artists represented at higher rankings than on the previous lists. 86 of the entries were 21st-century releases. One hundred fifty-four new entries were not on either of the two previous editions, and rap albums figured three times as much. Marvin Gaye's What's Going On (1971) was featured at the number one spot.

Reception
The original Rolling Stone 500 was criticized for being male-dominated, outmoded and almost entirely Anglo-American in focus. Writing in USA Today, Edna Gundersen described the list as predictable and "weighted toward testosterone-fueled vintage rock". Following the publicity surrounding the list, rock critic Jim DeRogatis, a former Rolling Stone editor, published Kill Your Idols: A New Generation of Rock Writers Reconsiders the Classics in 2004. The book featured a number of critics arguing against the high evaluation of various "great" albums, many of which had been included in the list.

Jonny Sharp, a contributor to NMEs own 500 greatest albums list, described the 2012 Rolling Stone list as a "soulless, canon-centric [list] of the same tired old titles", adding: "looking at their 500, when the only album in their top 10 less than 40 years old is London Calling, I think I prefer the NME'''s less critically-correct approach."

Responding to the 2020 revision, Consequence of Sounds Alex Young wrote that the lesser representation of white male rock musicians was "the biggest takeaway". According to CNN's Leah Asmelash, "The change represents a massive shift for the magazine, moving to recognize more contemporary albums and a wider range of tastes."

Statistics

Number of albums from each decade

 Artists with the most albums 
The following table lists the artists who had at least three albums included on at least one edition of the list (68 artists in total).

See also
 Album era
 All Time Top 1000 Albums Critic's Choice: Top 200 Albums NME'''s The 500 Greatest Albums of All Time]]
 1001 Albums You Must Hear Before You Die [[Rolling Stone's 500 Greatest Songs of All Time|Rolling Stones 500 Greatest Songs of All Time]]
 [[Rolling Stone's 100 Greatest Songwriters of All Time|Rolling Stone'''s 100 Greatest Songwriters of All Time]]
 [[Rolling Stone's 100 Greatest Artists of All Time|Rolling Stones 100 Greatest Artists of All Time

Notes

References

Further reading
 Paul Donoughue, "Rolling Stone's 500 'greatest albums of all time' list makes us question the meaning of classic", Australian Broadcasting Corporation, September 26, 2020.
 "Internet reacts to Rolling Stone's more inclusive 500 Greatest Albums list", Radio X, September 24, 2020.
 "'Rolling Stone' Updates Its List of the Greatest Albums of All Time", National Public Radio, September 25, 2020.
 Sheldon Pearce, "The Futility of Rolling Stone's Best-Albums List", The New Yorker, October 2, 2020.

External links

 500 Greatest Albums of All Time (2020 edition) by Rolling Stone''
 

Lists of albums
Rolling Stone articles